The British Rail Class 222 Meridian is a diesel-electric multiple-unit high-speed passenger train capable of . Twenty-seven sets were built by Bombardier Transportation in Bruges, Belgium.

The Class 222 is part of the Bombardier Voyager family, so it is very similar to the Class 220 Voyager and Class 221 Super Voyager trains used by CrossCountry and Avanti West Coast. In comparison, the Class 222s have a different interior and also have more components fitted under the floors to free up space within the body. Built for Midland Mainline and Hull Trains, today all are operated by East Midlands Railway and branded Meridians.

Details

This powers a generator, which supplies current to motors driving two axles per coach. Approximately  can be travelled between each refuelling.

Class 222 have rheostatic braking using the motors in reverse to generate electricity which is dissipated as heat through resistors situated on the roof of each coach; this saves on brake pad wear.

In common with the Class 220s, B5000 lightweight bogies are used - these are easily recognisable since the entire outer surface of the wheel is visible, with inboard axle bearings.

The Class 222 are fitted with Dellner couplers, as on Class 220 Voyager and Class 221 Super Voyager trains, though these units cannot work together in service because the Class 222 electrical connections are incompatible with the Class 220 and Class 221 trains.

All Class 222 units are maintained at the dedicated Derby Etches Park depot, just south of Derby railway station.

Formation
Class 222 units are currently running in the following formations:

East Midlands Railway: seven cars with 236 standard seats and 106 first-class seats.
Coach A - Standard class with driving cab and reservable space for two bikes
Coach B - Standard class
Coach C - Standard class
Coach D - Standard class with buffet counter
Coach F - First class
Coach G - First class
Coach H - First class, kitchen and driving cab

East Midlands Railway: five cars with 192 standard seats and 50 first-class seats
Coach A - Standard class with driving cab and reservable space for two bikes
Coach B - Standard class
Coach C - Standard class with Buffet counter
Coach D - Standard class / first class composite
Coach G - First class, kitchen and driving cab

The five-car units can be coupled to form ten-car services at peak times. When coupled together, coaches A-G are found in the front unit and the rear coaches become labelled J, K, L, M, N, with the first-class seats in coaches J and K.

Initially, the 23 units ordered for Midland Mainline were four-car and nine-car. Over time these have been gradually modified to the current formations. The four-car units ordered by Hull Trains had an option when constructed to be extended to five cars if required.

Operations

Midland region

With the exception of EMR Connect services, no route operated by East Midlands Railway is fully electrified. As a result, the majority of its fleet is composed of diesel trains such as the Class 222.

Midland Mainline introduced the first of 23 Class 222 units on 31 May 2004, branding them Meridian. These replaced all the Class 170 Turbostars and some of the High Speed Trains, having better acceleration than both of them.

Seven of the sets were nine-car Class 222 Meridians intended for an enhanced London St Pancras to Leeds service, but after the trains had been ordered, the Strategic Rail Authority decided not to allow them to run the service. The nine-car Meridians were used on London-Nottingham and some London-Sheffield services.

When the trains were ordered, Midland Mainline overestimated the number of first-class passengers, and the four-car Meridians had less standard-class seating than the three-car Turbostars they replaced. Coach D subsequently had a section of first-class seating declassified for use by standard-class passengers.

At the end of 2006, Midland Mainline removed a carriage from each of the nine-car sets and extended seven of the four-car sets, using the removed carriages.

Following the formation of the new East Midlands rail franchise in November 2007, the entire fleet of Class 222 Meridians was inherited by East Midlands Trains, which operated the expanded East Midlands rail franchise, including all routes previously run by Midland Mainline.

East Midlands Trains had named the following Meridians:

In 2008 further rearrangements were made to the sets: another carriage was removed from the eight-car Meridians, except for unit 222007, which was reduced to five cars with two of the first-class coaches converted to part standard and part first class. The surplus coaches were then added to the four-car Meridians. These changes, which took place from March to October 2008, resulted in six seven-car sets (222001–222006) and 17 five-car sets (222007–222023).

The seven-car trains are almost exclusively used on the fast services between London St Pancras and Sheffield. Since the retirement of the HSTs, they have commenced working London St Pancras to Leeds via Sheffield. The five-car trains are mainly used between London St Pancras and Sheffield, Nottingham or Corby on semi-fast services, and at off-peak times. The four-car trains supplement the five-car trains on these services, or can alternatively form standalone services.

In December 2008, the Class 222 Meridians started work on the hourly London St Pancras to Sheffield services, because they have faster acceleration than the High Speed Trains and so were able to reduce the Sheffield to London journey time by 12 minutes. The hourly Nottingham service was then transferred to High Speed Train running to cover for the Meridians now working the hourly Sheffield fast service.

In February 2009, units 222101 and 222102 transferred from Hull Trains to East Midlands Trains, and were quickly repainted in the East Midlands Trains white livery. Unit 222104 followed later in the year, and unit 222103 a further few months later after repairs had been completed: unit 222103 had been out of service for two years since early 2007, when the unit fell from jacks at Bombardier's Crofton works.

In August 2019, following the Department for Transport's awarding of the East Midlands franchise to Abellio, all of the 222 fleet transferred to new operator East Midlands Railway.

Hull services

Hull Trains introduced Class 222 Pioneer units, to replace its Class 170 Turbostars in May 2005. The units reduced journey times between Hull and London King's Cross by up to 20 minutes. The Pioneers had a different interior colour scheme and less first-class seating than the Meridians.

First Hull Trains' fleet consisted of four four-car Pioneers.

First Hull Trains decided to use only Class 180 units from 2009 onwards. The Class 222s were transferred to East Midlands Trains in 2008/09 and are now branded Meridian.

Refurbishment
East Midlands Trains refurbished its entire Class 222 fleet. The refurbishment included new seat covers and carpets in standard class. First class received new leather seat covers along with a new colour scheme and carpets. The refurbishment started in February 2011 and was complete by spring 2012.

Incidents 
On 10 June 2006, unit 222009 working 1D17 10:30 London to Sheffield had to be taken out of service due to a door being discovered open at Desborough, Northamptonshire whilst at speed. The Rail Accident Investigation Branch (RAIB) report determined that the incident was probably caused by a sequence of events which would not have been possible with a traditional manually-operated mechanical door: a combination of a piece of dirt incorporated in the door lock switch during manufacture and a software bug in the door control system allowed the door to remain unlocked after the train called at Luton, but prevented this condition being detected. Deflation and inflation of the pneumatic door seals, initiated automatically by detectors responding to the train stopping and starting at subsequent stations, then gradually prised the door out of its socket until at a point north of Kettering it became able to open. This condition was detected and an automatic brake application initiated, whereupon the inertial forces caused the door to slide open fully; however the indications presented in the driver's cab were ambiguous and were interpreted as caused by faulty systems, and he, therefore, cancelled the brake application. The train was finally halted at Desborough summit after a passenger reported that the door was open.
On 20 February 2010, unit 222005 working 1F45 14:55 London to Sheffield derailed near East Langton, Leicestershire. Two wheels on Coach E in the middle of the train came off the track; on approaching the site of the derailment the train was travelling at close to 100 mph. No other wheels derailed and the train remained upright. There were also reports that one or more road vehicles on an adjacent highway were struck and damaged by debris as the derailed train passed. 222005 was moved from the site the next day after a replacement bogie was fitted and was for a few months formed of vehicles of 222101 and 222022 including a standard class cab end which was temporarily renumbered until the damaged vehicles were returned to the set in mid-June. The derailment caused damage to the Midland Main Line near Kibworth for a distance of two miles, the line underwent emergency repairs by Network Rail to get the stretch of line back open for start of service on 24 February 2010. The RAIB investigated the incident and found that it was caused by a complete fracture of the axle, due to a bearing stiffening to the point where it would no longer rotate properly. The RAIB recommended that a review of gearbox and axle design be undertaken, and that the class 22X final drive oil sampling regime be improved.
 On 20 April 2012, at 08:44, an East Midlands Trains Class 222 unit pulled into Nottingham station where both the driver and station staff noticed smoke coming from underneath one of the carriages. The engine underneath the carriage had caught fire from overheating – which occurred due to day-to-day grime which had built up underneath the train and then been heated up by the movement of the wheels. Both the train and the station were evacuated, but there were no injuries.
 On 14 February 2016, unit 222005 was in collision with a conveyor boom left foul of the line at Barrow-upon-Soar, Leicestershire. The lead vehicle suffered substantial damage and the driver was shaken but uninjured. No injuries were reported amongst the 85 passengers, although the boom operator was severely injured. The RAIB determined that poorly maintained electrical components on the wagon conveyor boom caused the boom to rotate further than intended, leaving it foul of the main line.

Future
All are scheduled to be returned to Eversholt Rail Group in the future once Class 810s replace them on EMR Intercity services. There is a possibility that CrossCountry will lease these units for extra capacity.

Other prospective operators

Enterprise
In 2005, HSBC Rail took delivery of the seven nine-car trains planned for use by Midland Mainline on its London-Leeds service, but the trains were left idle when the Strategic Rail Authority prevented Midland Mainline from operating this service. HSBC Rail made contact with Northern Ireland Railways and Iarnród Éireann, with a view to their leasing these units for use by Enterprise. Using these trains on the Belfast-Dublin line was one of a number of options, which also included the purchase of additional 22000 Class railcars or cascaded coaching stock. In the event, the trains entered service with MML providing the fast services from London to Nottingham, thus releasing High Speed Trains. The trains would have required significant modification to be used by Northern Ireland Railways, including reducing each train from nine to eight cars (the maximum length of stations on the Belfast-Dublin line), and converting them from standard gauge to Irish gauge (5 ft 3 inches).

Grand Central
Grand Central, on the announcement of its open-access operation to Sunderland in the summer of 2006, planned to run its services using five Class 222 units, with the intention of starting by the end of that year. However, this never happened, pushing back the planned start date while the company looked for alternatives. Grand Central finally started operating in December 2007 using three High Speed Trains.

Fleet details

References

Further reading

External links 

222
Bombardier Transportation multiple units
High-speed trains of the United Kingdom
Train-related introductions in 2004